The Dominican Republic women's national beach handball team is the national team of the Dominican Republic. It is governed by the Dominican Republic Handball Federation and takes part in international beach handball competitions.

The team participated at the 2006 Beach Handball World Championships held in Copacabana, Brazil.

World Championships results
 2006 – 10th place
 2008 – 11th place

Other competitions results
2022 Central American and Caribbean Beach Games – 4th place

References

External links
Official website
IHF profile

Beach handball
Women's national beach handball teams